George Baines may refer to:

 George Washington Baines (1809–1882), American Baptist clergyman, professor and president of Baylor University
 George Grenfell Baines (1908–2003), English architect and town planner

See also 
 George Bain (disambiguation)